Tha Wang Pha is a district (amphoe) in the central part of Nan province, northern Thailand.

History
The minor district (king amphoe) Tha Wang Pha was established on 1 October 1962 with area split off from Pua district. It was upgraded to a full district on 28 July 1965.

Geography
Neighboring districts are, from the north clockwise, Song Khwae, Chiang Klang, Pua, Santi Suk and Mueang Nan of Nan Province, and Pong of Phayao province.

Climate

Administration
The district is divided into 10 sub-districts (tambons), which are further subdivided into 91 villages (mubans). Tha Wang Pha is a township (thesaban tambon) covering parts of the same-named tambon. There are a further nine tambon administrative organizations (TAO).

Economy
Ban Fai Mun village in the district is known for its fine knives. Nan and Phrae Provinces were settled by Tai Phuan people who migrated to northern Thailand in 1834 from Laos. The people of Ban Fai Mun brought with them a distinctive dialect, way of life, and a knife making tradition. About 10% of the population of 1,134 make their living by making knives.

Gallery

References

External links
amphoe.com

Tha Wang Pha